"If You Talk in Your Sleep" is a 1974 Elvis Presley song released as a single and featured on Elvis Presley's 1975 album Promised Land. The song was written by Red West and Johnny Christopher, who had earlier written "Mama Liked the Roses" and "Always on My Mind", both recorded by Elvis Presley.

Background
The song was recorded during sessions at Stax Records in Memphis, Tennessee, in December 1973.

Chart performance
Released as a single in North America on May 10, 1974, with the B-side "Help Me", it reached No. 6 on the Billboard Adult Contemporary chart in June 1974 and No. 17 on the Billboard Pop Singles chart in August 1974.

Cover versions
The song was covered by Little Milton and reached No. 34 on the Billboard soul singles chart in April 1975.

References

 
 

1974 singles
Elvis Presley songs
Songs written by Red West
1974 songs
Songs written by Johnny Christopher